The men's large hill individual ski jumping competition for the 2018 Winter Olympics in Pyeongchang, South Korea was held on 16 and 17 February 2018 at the Alpensia Ski Jumping Stadium.

In the victory ceremony, the medals were presented by Irena Szewińska, member of the International Olympic Committee, accompanied by Apoloniusz Tajner, President of the Polish Ski Federation.

Results

Qualifying
The qualifying was held on 16 February 2018.

Final
The final was held on 17 February at 21:30.

References

Ski jumping at the 2018 Winter Olympics
Men's events at the 2018 Winter Olympics